Khategaon Assembly constituency is one of the 230 Vidhan Sabha (Legislative Assembly) constituencies of Madhya Pradesh state in central India.

It is part of Dewas District.

See also
Khategaon

References

Assembly constituencies of Madhya Pradesh
Dewas district